Queen Anne's Bounty was a scheme established in 1704 to augment the incomes of the poorer clergy of the Church of England, and by extension the organisation ("The Governors of the Bounty of Queen Anne for the Augmentation of the Maintenance of the Poor Clergy") which administered the bounty (and eventually a number of other forms of assistance to poor livings).

Original structure
The bounty was originally funded by the annates monies: "first fruits" (the first year's income of a cleric newly appointed to a benefice) and "tenths" – a tenth of the income in subsequent years traditionally paid by English clergy to the pope until the Reformation, and thereafter to the Crown. Henry VIII, on becoming the recipient of these monies had had them carefully valued and specified as sums of money. This valuation was never revised, and in 1920 the income from First Fruits and Tenths was between £15,000 and £16,000.

The bounty money was to be used to increase the income of livings yielding less than £80 a year. It was not paid directly to incumbents, but instead used to purchase land (generally £200-worth), the income from which augmented the living. The livings to be augmented were selected by lot from those with an annual income less than £10, or (in the early years of the bounty) those where augmentation by a third party was offered conditional upon augmentation by bounty funds. Parishes worth less than £20 a year were included in the ballot in 1747, those worth less than £30 a year in 1788, those under £50 in 1810.

Later developments
Augmented parishes came to find it more convenient to not actually purchase land, but to leave the purchase money deposited with the bounty, who paid a guaranteed but moderate rate of interest. The money held by the bounty was invested at higher rates of interest, the difference between interest paid the bounty on their investments, and that paid by the bounty to parishes going to meet the running costs of the bounty and to increase the funds available for augmentation. In 1829 the purchase money deposited with the bounty amounted to over £1m, which was invested in bank annuities (financial instruments of fluctuating value, then worth over £1.3m); by 1900 the bounty was holding over £7m credited to various augmented livings.

The original (first fruits and tenths) income and that from interest rate differences on money on deposit with the bounty, had by 1815 allowed the allocation of nearly £1.5m of capital (securing nearly £0.5m of third-party benefactions) to augment the income of 3,300 livings. To accelerate augmentation, between 1809 and 1820 Parliament made annual grants to the bounty of £100,000; £1.1m in total. As a result, by 1824 all livings under £30 a year had been augmented and there were funds in hand to permit the augmentation of all livings worth under £50 a year. By 1841, it was estimated, the operations of the bounty (discounting the effects of the Parliamentary grants of 1809-20) had secured additional church income over ten times that of the first fruits and tenths.

The Ecclesiastical Commission reported (1836) the following data on low-income livings:

(As a rough comparison, in Queen Anne's reign, 3,800 livings had been worth less than £50 a year and therefore excused (in perpetuity) payment of first fruits and tenths.)

After 1836, bounty augmentations were generally to match third party benefactions to livings worth less than £200 a year. In 1890, the total amount distributed was £176,896.

On 2 April 1947, by the Church Commissioners Measure 1947, the functions and assets of Queen Anne's Bounty were merged with the Ecclesiastical Commissioners to form the Church Commissioners.
The archives of Queen Anne's Bounty are now held by the Church of England Record Centre; specific documents may be consulted by appointment.

On 16 June 2022 the Church Commissioners published an interim report on research into links between Queen Anne's Bounty and the Atlantic slave trade. The report said that Queen Anne's Bounty had invested significant sums in the South Sea Company, which transported 34,000 slaves to the Spanish Americas in the 18th century, and had received benefactions from people with links to slavery, including Edward Colston. Justin Welby, the Archbishop of Canterbury, apologised for the links with slavery identified in the report. In January 2023 the Church Commissioners announced that they were setting up a fund of £100 million to be spent over the next nine years on addressing historic links with slavery.

Legislation
 The Queen Anne's Bounty Act 1703 (2 & 3 Anne c 20)
 
The Queen Anne's Bounty Acts 1706 to 1870 is the collective title of the following Acts:
The Queen Anne's Bounty Act 1706 (6 Anne c 24)
The Queen Anne's Bounty Act 1707 (6 Anne c 54)
The Queen Anne's Bounty Act 1714 (1 Geo 1 stat 2 c 10)
The Queen Anne's Bounty Act 1716 (3 Geo 1 c 10)
The Queen Anne's Bounty Act 1803 (43 Geo 3 c 107)
The Queen Anne's Bounty Act 1805 (45 Geo 3 c 84)
The Queen Anne's Bounty Act 1838 (1 & 2 Vict c 20)
The Queen Anne's Bounty Act 1840 (3 & 4 Vict c 20)
The Queen Anne's Bounty (Superannuation) Act 1870 (33 & 34 Vict c 89)

See also
 Board of First Fruits, in Ireland
 Commission for Building Fifty New Churches
 John Ecton (d. 1730)
 First fruits in Scotland

References

External links
Queen Anne's Bounty Tercentenary Commemorative Booklet

1704 establishments in England
1947 disestablishments in England
History of the Church of England
Economic history of England